Polda is a Czech adventure video game series developed by Sleep Team which began with the release of Polda in 1998. The main character is a policeman, Pankrác. In some titles he is a private detective. Polda 1 was in 1999 the best selling game in the Czech Republic, it is also the most popular Czech adventure serie.

Sequels 
Polda spawned seven sequels between 1998–2022, developed by ZIMA software. The English translation has only the sixth sequel and the first two sequels for mobile systems.

Series

Polda 1 
Polda 1 was released in 1998 on Windows and DOS, it was created by Sleep Team and produced by Zima software. The game has 2D drawn graphics and contains many humorous scenes. The story follows a cop called Pankrác, who is solving a strange kidnappings in the village Lupany. Also for Android and iOS.

Polda 2 
The license remained in the hands of Martin Zima, and following unsuccessful legal action, Sleep Team lost any percentage of the sale of future Polda games. Polda 2 was then created by Zima Software in 1999. Cop Pankrác is in the city of Marsias investigating a fire in hotel, then the plot unfolds and he deals with the cloning of people in the organization DNA Revolution.

In 2010 the game was re-released for the iOS mobile platforms and later on Android, where it was translated into English and French language under the title: Awesome Cop.

Polda 3 
Polda 3 was released in 2000. As a private detective, Pankrác solves the case of kidnapped cook of hockey player Jaromír Jégr, but the story unfolds, almost, to saving entire world. Also for Android and iOS. It was originally intended to be the final Polda game, finishing the trilogy.

Polda 4 
Polda 4 was released in 2002, departing from the previous artistic style by incorporating a hybrid 2D / 3D design. Using a time machine, Pankrác travels through time and gets into a fictional near future, where, for example, the Soviet Communists dominated the world. Also for Android and iOS. It was translated into Polish as: Strażnik Czasu (Time Guardian).

Polda 5 
Polda 5 was released in 2005. Pankrác traveled in time again, helping the secret organization and gets for example to ancient Greece. It was translated into Italian called: Polda - Agente 610 and into Russian under the title: Пан Польда и тайны времени (Mr. Polda and the Secret of Time).

Polda 6 
Polda 6 was released in 2014. Again, this is a detective plot, this time the Oscar winners list will disappear. Also for Android and iOS. It was translated into English and German under the title: Detective Hayseed - Hollywood.

Polda 7 
For the seventh sequel the authors launched a crowdfunding campaign on the HitHit server, where they managed to collect the entire required amount during the first days. Polda solves the case of an alien flying machine and attends a meeting of the world celebrities. The game was released in April 2022.

Critical reception 
The first game in the series was a huge success and became in 1999 the best selling game in the Czech Republic.

Bonusweb.cz rated the first six games in the series at 91%, 71%, 72%, 77%, 60%, and 60% respectively.

See also
 Video games in the Czech Republic

References

External links 
 Official website

1998 video games
Adventure games
Android (operating system) games
Detective video games
IOS games
Video games about police officers
Video games about time travel
Video games developed in the Czech Republic
Video games set in the Czech Republic
Windows games